John Burgess may refer to:

John Burgess (actor) (1933–2010), actor
John Burgess (1563–1635), English Puritan clergyman,  also John Burges
John Burgess (political scientist) (1844–1931), American political scientist
John Burgess (host) (born 1943), Australian television/radio personality
John Burgess (1790s cricketer), 18th century cricketer 
John Burgess (cricketer, born 1880) (1880–1953), English cricketer
John Burgess (bishop) (1909–2003), Bishop of the Diocese of Massachusetts
John Burgess (priest) (born 1930), Archdeacon of Bath
John Burgess (record producer) (1932–2014), British co-founder of Associated Independent Recording
John Burgess (rugby union) (1928–2015), Irish rugby union player
John Burgess (rugby union coach) (1924–1997), English rugby union coach
John Bagnold Burgess (1829–1897), English painter
John Cart Burgess (1798–1863), English painter
John D. Burgess (1934–2005), Scottish bagpiper
John K. Burgess, member of the Great and General Court
John P. Burgess (born 1948), professor of philosophy at Princeton University
John S. Burgess (1920–2007), Speaker of the Vermont House of Representatives and Lieutenant Governor of Vermont
John Wesley Burgess (1907–1990), Canadian Member of Parliament

See also
John Burgess Karslake (1821–1881), English lawyer and politician